Mickey Hardt (born March 27, 1969) is an actor, model and martial artist born in Switzerland. He is best known for his role in the German television series . Hardt is skilled in Taekwondo and Savate.

Life and career
Hardt's interest in martial arts began at the age of 8. He started training in Taekwondo in Luxembourg from 1984 and received his 1st dan three years later. 

His career however, started with modeling and then he took acting classes. He was discovered by Hong Kong-based martial artist Donnie Yen, who was working on the choreography of a German action series called . Hardt also trained with Yen's stunt team and appeared in the Hong Kong movie The Twins Effect.

He starred as the titular hero in Max Havoc: Curse of the Dragon (2004) alongside David Carradine and in its sequel, Max Havoc: Ring of Fire (2006).

Hardt received his 2nd dan in Taekwondo in 2011.

Selected filmography
 (1999–2000, TV series)
The Twins Effect (2003)
Sabine (2004–2005, TV series)
Max Havoc: Curse of the Dragon (2004)
Max Havoc: Ring of Fire (2006)
 (2008)
Alisa – Folge deinem Herzen (2010, TV series)
Alles was zählt (2011, TV series)
Allein gegen die Zeit (2012, TV series)
Blind Spot (2012)
Guardians (2012)
Air Force One Is Down (2012, TV film)
Beauty and the Beast (2014)
Gooische Vrouwen 2 (2014)
Verbotene Liebe (2014–2015, TV series)
Souvenir (2016)
Rote Rosen (2016–2017, TV series)

References

External links
 
 

Swiss male film actors
Swiss male television actors
21st-century Swiss male actors
1969 births
Swiss male taekwondo practitioners
Swiss savateurs
Swiss male models
Living people